Wally Gonzalez (December 27, 1949 – July 23, 2021) was a Filipino bluesman, guitarist and proponent of Pinoy Rock. Gonzalez formed and led the Juan de la Cruz Band which, with the collaboration of bassist-vocalist Mike Hanopol and drummer-vocalist Pepe Smith, rose to unprecedented national prominence as a power trio.

Early career
Wally Gonzalez formed the Juan de la Cruz Band with drummer Edmond Fortuno in 1968, although the collaboration was disrupted by Fortuno's departure and splinter group, Anak Bayan. Left to his own devices, Gonzalez soldiered on with new incarnations of Juan de la Cruz, sustaining sufficient interest towards the release of the band's first album, Up In Arms (1971), despite meeting only with moderate success. The timely arrivals of Pepe Smith and Mike Hanopol from their extended engagements in Japan, however, created a propitious situation for Gonzalez to create a power trio under a reinvigorated Juan de la Cruz identity. The reinvention resulted in the groundbreaking album and its title track, the Pinoy Rock anthem Himig Natin (trans. "Our Melody") (1973). Prior to their culminating partnership, Gonzalez, Hanopol and Smith have played together in varying combinations in earlier groups, such as the Downbeats, Jungle Cats, Zero History and Smith's "Japrock" excursion, Speed, Glue & Shinki (later joined by Hanopol). The innovative triumvirate's launch was heralded among Philippine music circles as the pioneering Pinoy rock initiative in the field of OPM. Their landmark trio album was followed by a more ambitious work, the album Maskara (1974), that featured a ballad composed and sung by Gonzalez, complemented by a full string orchestra.

Later career
Gonzalez was dubbed as "the quiet Juan" because of his reticent and non-flamboyant demeanor. Parallel to the spinoff solo works released by his Juan de la Cruz Band colleagues, Wally Gonzalez released two solo albums of his own, Tunog Pinoy (trans. "Filipino Sound") (1977) and On the Road (1978). He broke through the charts with a guitar instrumental entitled "Wally's Blues", featured in his second solo album. As a fitting epilogue, Gonzalez returned to the recording studio for what became the final Juan de la Cruz album project, four years later since the band's prior release; with their most accessible albeit commercial work, Kahit Anong Mangyari (trans. "Whatever Happens") (1980).

In 1986, Wally Gonzalez retired as a musician and worked as a shipping company's treasurer for ten years, but decided on re-emerging sporadically starting in 1995. Onwards, Wally and Friends began the rounds of bars in Metro Manila, transforming into the Wally Gonzalez Bandwagon in 2002. His groups were a revolving door for emergent Pinoy Rock talent such as drummers Chris Messer, Vic Mercado, Bea Lao and Wendell Garcia; bassists Dondi Ledesma, Louie Talan and Norman Ferrer; keyboardist Wowie Posadas; vocalists Joonie Centeno and Kat Agarrado; and second guitarists such as Ted Nicholoff, King Pineda and Armand Quimpo.

Discography

Juan Dela Cruz Band reunion
Spurred by a slew of bar gigs featuring Wally Gonzalez and Pepe Smith performing together as a duo in the early 2000s, the Juan de la Cruz Band were engaged for a reunion concert on June 11, 2005 at the Philippine World Trade Center in Pasay City.

Death
Wally Gonzalez died in his sleep in the morning of July 23, 2021 in his home in Don Galo, Parañaque, Philippines. Months earlier, in January 2021, Gonzalez had suffered a stroke that rendered him weak and unable to move. His son later confirmed that his father also tested positive for COVID-19 and had been fighting a blood infection.

References

External links
 
Photo of Wally Gonzalez at flickr.com

1949 births
2021 deaths
Filipino rock guitarists
Filipino rock musicians
People from Sampaloc, Manila